Sartaq  (or Sartak, Sartach) Khan (died 1257) was the son of Batu Khan and Regent Dowager Khatun Boraqchin of Alchi Tatar. Sartaq succeeded Batu as khan of the Golden Horde.

Reign
In 1252, Alexander Nevsky met with Sartaq at Sarai. Alexander received yarlyk (license) to become Grand Duke of Vladimir in vassalage to the Kipchak Khanate. According to Lev Gumilev he became Sartaq's anda (sworn brother, akin to blood brother) and an adopted son of Batu Khan.

His reign as khan of the Golden Horde was short-lived. He died in 1256 before returning from Great Khan Möngke's court in Mongolia, less than one year after his father, probably having been poisoned by his uncles Berke and Berkhchir. Sartaq was succeeded by Ulaqchi briefly in 1257, before his uncle Berke succeeded to the throne. It is not clear whether Ulaqchi was his brother or his son.

Sartaq's daughter Feodora (or Theothiure) was the wife of Gleb Vasilkovich, first Prince Belozersky of Beloozero and Rostov, a grandson of Konstantin of Rostov. Theirs daughter Maria Glebovna Belozerskaya married Daniel Alexandrovich (the son of Alexander Nevsky) and become the mother of Ivan Kalita

See also
List of Khans of the Golden Horde

Books

References

External links
Michael Marcotte: Marcotte Genealogy - Khan genealogy chart (shows part of Sartaq's family; Sartaq is called Sartuk Khan of the Blue Horde)

Year of birth missing
1256 deaths
Khans of the Golden Horde
Converts to Christianity from pagan religions
13th-century monarchs in Europe
Mongol Empire Christians